Acanthodela erythrosema is a species of moth of the family Oecophoridae. It is known from the Australian Capital Territory, New South Wales, Queensland, South Australia, Tasmania and Victoria.

The larvae have feed on the dead leaves of Eucalyptus species. They live in flat, oval case in dead leaves.

References

External links
CSIRO Ecosystem Sciences - Australian Moths Online

Oecophorinae
Moths described in 1886